is one of the Cairngorms mountains in the Scottish Highlands. It is in the western massif of the Cairngorms, standing between Braeriach and Cairn Toul, overlooking An Garbh Choire and the Lairig Ghru pass. It was promoted to Munro status by the Scottish Mountaineering Club's 1997 revision of the tables.

It is usually climbed together with other peaks: if coming from the south it may be climbed with Cairn Toul and The Devil's Point, whilst from the north one must first cross Braeriach.

The mountain takes its name from An Lochan Uaine, the lochan lying in the corrie on the north-east side of the peak. It is also sometimes called "The Angel's Peak", a name allegedly given to it in the 19th century by Alexander Copland, a founding member of the Cairngorm Club, in contrast to the nearby Devil's Point.

See also
 List of Munro mountains
 Mountains and hills of Scotland

References

Munros
Mountains and hills of the Cairngorms
Mountains and hills of Aberdeenshire
Mountains and hills of Highland (council area)
One-thousanders of Scotland